Nemophas rosenbergii is a species of beetle in the family Cerambycidae. It was described by Ritsema in 1881. It is known from Sulawesi.

References

rosenbergii
Beetles described in 1881